1960 Emperor's Cup Final was the 40th final of the Emperor's Cup competition. The final was played at Utsubo Football Stadium in Osaka on May 6, 1960. Furukawa Electric won the championship.

Overview
Furukawa Electric won their 1st title, by defeating Keio BRB 4–0.

Match details

See also
1960 Emperor's Cup

References

Emperor's Cup
Emperor's Cup Final
JEF United Chiba matches
Emperor's Cup Final